Melbury Sampford is a village and civil parish  northwest of Dorchester, in the Dorset district, in the ceremonial county of Dorset, England. In 2001 the parish had a population of 33. The parish touches East Chelborough, Evershot, Melbury Bubb, Melbury Osmond and Stockwood.

Features 
There are 12 listed buildings in Melbury Sampford. There is a church called St Mary next to Melbury House.

History 
The name "Melbury" may mean 'Multi-coloured fortification', the "Sampford" part from the Saunford family.

References

External links 

 

Villages in Dorset
Civil parishes in Dorset
West Dorset District